Inforum, headquartered in downtown Detroit and in Grand Rapids, was founded as the Women's Economic Club in July 1962. The Women's Economic Club, as it was known for 42 years, officially received its charter from the National Federation of Business and Professional Women's Clubs (NFBPWC) in 1962. It became an independent organization with its own by laws in 1965.

In 2005, members voted to change the name of the organization to Inforum: A Professional Women's Alliance to better reflect the mission of the organization, which is to strengthen the business environment in Michigan by creating opportunities for women to lead and succeed. Programming encompasses not only luncheons, but seminars, leadership courses, and other networking events which allow members to build alliances with colleagues into empowering combinations.

Inforum today
Today, Inforum is a professional organization focused on creating strategic connections and accelerating careers for women throughout Michigan and the Midwest.   It has more than 2000 members and 70 corporate members.

Since 2003, Inforum has published a biennial study with the Wayne State University School of Business Administration to analyze the number of women board members on Fortune 500 companies.

Leadership
The 52-person Inforum Board of Directors is led by Diana Tremblay, vice president of global services, General Motors. Terry Barclay is the organization's President and CEO.

References

 Detroit Free Press, “New Women’s Club a Reality,” July 30, 1962
 
 

Women's organizations based in the United States